Stepping Stones Museum for Children is a hands-on children's museum for ages 10 and under located at 303 West Avenue, in the Central section of Norwalk, Connecticut.

The museum's interactive exhibit areas include: "Energy Lab"; a "Multimedia Gallery" with a theater, a broadcast studio, and a -by--foot high-definition screen; Exhibits include "Healthyville", about bodies and healthy living; "Tot Town", an exploration area just for toddlers; "Family and Teacher Resource Center" where parents, caregivers and teachers have access to information and programs about learning through play, early literacy, 21st century learning skills and the developmental needs of young children, helping them to facilitate a child's learning – at home or at school.

The entrance lobby houses ColorCoaster, a  kinetic sculpture designed by artist George Rhoads.

The garden features three Kinetic Energy Sculptures designed by Beinfield Architecture, which use local solar, wind and water energy. This colorful set of kinetic sculptures demonstrate simple principles of energy generation while creating percussive music.

In 2011 the museum received LEED Gold Certification. Recognized by the Governor of Connecticut as one of the first projects in the state to achieve LEED Gold status. The design employs a range of solutions, from energy efficiency and use of alternative energy sources, to ensuring healthy indoor air quality and water conservation. Each element was harnessed to enhance the educational mission of the museum.

The museum is located in Mathews Park, adjacent to the Lockwood–Mathews Mansion, the Center for Contemporary Printmaking, a gallery and studio for printmaking, and Devon's Place, a playground designed for all children to play together, including those with physical, sensory and mental challenges.

History
Stepping Stones was founded in 2000 by Gigi Priebe. In its first 10 years of operation, the museum received two million  visits.

The museum underwent a $17 million renovation in 2010, which closed Stepping Stones from August 17 to late November (with a "grand reopening" on November 20) and resulted in a  expansion, roughly doubling the indoor space of the facility. The project, designed by Beinfield Architecture,  enhanced the Museum with a natural, energy-efficient work environment. The project utilized recycled from locally-sourced materials and included the construction of a forty-foot screen multi-media theatre and communication facility, an interior telescope for viewing rooftop plant and animal life, and three garden “follies” utilizing solar, wind and water energy.

The museum received LEED Gold status in 2011, as well as Green Advocate and Merit awards from The Connecticut Green Building Council, citing the project team's “commitment to sustainability from the outset, an attitude that clearly impacted every decision, from design through construction and beyond. The function of the institution as a children's museum also offers the opportunity to educate and energize young minds about these goals both during construction and on a daily functioning basis.

Notes 
Renovations were made to the Tot Town and Healthyville exhibits;[3]

The "Energy Lab" exhibit replaced the "Water Scape" exhibit; the "Rainforest Adventure" exhibit formerly a permanent installation will be housed in a wing for traveling exhibits.

See also

 The Children's Museum
 Children's Museum of Southeastern Connecticut
 Connecticut Children's Museum
 Connecticut Science Center
 Discovery Museum and Planetarium
 Eli Whitney Museum
 List of museums in Connecticut
 Maritime Aquarium at Norwalk

References

External links
Stepping Stones Museum for Children

Children's museums in Connecticut
Culture of Norwalk, Connecticut
Buildings and structures in Norwalk, Connecticut
Museums in Fairfield County, Connecticut
Tourist attractions in Norwalk, Connecticut